North Lambton is a suburb of Newcastle, New South Wales, Australia, located  from Newcastle's central business district. It is part of the City of Newcastle local government area.
North Lambton is a mostly housed area close to the Lambton City Centre.

References

Suburbs of Newcastle, New South Wales